Don't Breathe is a 2016 American horror-thriller film produced and directed by Fede Álvarez, co-produced by Sam Raimi and Robert Tapert, and co-written by Álvarez and Rodo Sayagues. The film stars Jane Levy, Dylan Minnette, Daniel Zovatto and Stephen Lang, and focuses on three friends who get trapped inside a blind man's house while breaking into it. The film was produced by Ghost House Pictures and Good Universe and distributed by Sony Pictures Releasing.

In contrast to his previous work on Evil Dead, director Álvarez decided the project would have less blood, an original storyline, more suspense, and no dependence on supernatural elements—which he felt were overused. The project, originally titled A Man in the Dark, was later announced in early 2014, with Álvarez directing, Sayagues writing, Raimi and Tapert producing, and Levy starring. Principal photography began on June 29, 2015, and wrapped in July 2015 in Detroit.

Don't Breathe premiered at South by Southwest on March 12, 2016, and was theatrically released on August 26, 2016, by Screen Gems and Stage 6 Films. The film grossed over $157 million and received largely positive reviews from critics, who praised the performances, direction, screenplay, and tense atmosphere. A sequel was released on August 13, 2021, with Lang reprising his role, to mixed reviews.

Plot 
Rocky, Alex, and Money are three Detroit delinquents who make a living by breaking into houses and stealing valuables. Rocky longs to move to California with her younger sister, Diddy, and escape from their abusive mother and her alcoholic boyfriend. To the trio's frustration, their fence keeps undervaluing the items they bring. Money receives a tip from their fence that Gulf War veteran Norman Nordstrom has $300,000 in cash in his house in an abandoned Detroit neighborhood. The cash was reportedly a settlement after a wealthy young woman, Cindy Roberts, killed Norman's daughter in a car accident. The three spy on the house and learn that Norman is blind.

At night, the gang approach the house, drug Nordstrom's rottweiler dog, then break in. Money puts a sleeping gas bottle in Nordstrom's bedroom. Seeing a locked basement door, Money assumes the loot is hidden in there and shoots the lock. The noise wakes up Nordstrom, who overpowers Money, takes the gun, and kills him while Rocky silently watches. Rocky witnesses Nordstrom open a hidden safe to check his valuables. After he leaves, she opens the safe and takes the cash. However, Nordstrom finds Rocky and Alex's shoes and realizes there are more intruders, then returns to find the safe empty.

Rocky and Alex evade Nordstrom and enter the basement. There, they find a restrained and gagged pregnant woman who reveals herself to be Cindy Roberts. Rocky and Alex free her and attempt to open the storm cellar door. Nordstrom shoots at them, accidentally killing Cindy. Nordstrom breaks down and cries in distress over her body. He then shuts off the lights, plunging the basement into darkness. After a blind chase and struggle, Alex knocks out Nordstrom and they flee upstairs.

After blocking the basement door, they encounter the dog, who has awakened, and flee into the bedroom. Rocky escapes the room through a ventilation duct. Alex falls out of a window onto a skylight and is knocked out. When Alex awakens, Nordstrom shoots out the skylight and corners him in the utility room, stabbing him with a pair of garden shears. The dog pursues Rocky through the vents before she is captured by Nordstrom.

Rocky wakes up restrained in the basement. Nordstrom reveals that Cindy was pregnant with a "replacement" for his daughter. He then prepares to artificially inseminate Rocky using a turkey baster, promising to let her go after she gives him a child. Alex, who survived by tricking Nordstrom into stabbing Money's corpse, saves Rocky and handcuffs Nordstrom.

Rocky and Alex try to leave through the front door. Nordstrom breaks free and shoots Alex dead. Rocky flees as the dog pursues her. She traps the dog in her car trunk but gets captured again by Nordstrom. After being dragged back inside his house, Rocky disorients him by setting off the alarm system, then hits him repeatedly in the head with a crowbar and pushes him into the basement. The gun fires into his side as he falls. Believing him dead, Rocky escapes before the police arrive.

Later, Rocky and Diddy see a news report about the incident. Nordstrom, who is recovering in a hospital and under stable condition, is reported to have killed two intruders (Alex and Money) in self-defense. He does not mention Rocky, Cindy or the stolen cash. Rocky and Diddy board a train to Los Angeles.

Cast 
 Jane Levy as Roxanne / "Rocky", a Detroit thief who wants to escape to California for a better life
 Stephen Lang as Norman Nordstorm / "The Blind Man", a veteran of the Gulf War who was blinded by shrapnel
 Dylan Minnette as Alex, a Detroit thief and Rocky's friend
 Daniel Zovatto as Money, a Detroit thief and Rocky's boyfriend
 Franciska Törőcsik as Cindy Roberts
 Emma Bercovici as Diddy, Rocky's younger sister
 Christian Zagia as Raul
 Katia Bokor as Ginger, Rocky's abusive mother
 Sergej Onopko as Trevor

Production

Development
Fede Álvarez noted that making the film was, in some ways, a reaction to his debut film Evil Dead (2013), specifically the criticisms that the film had too much blood, focused too much on shocking the audience, and was a remake. In response, Álvarez decided to make Don't Breathe, an original story that contained less blood and focused more on suspense over shocking audiences. He wanted to avoid making a film dealing with the supernatural, as he felt that was too trendy.

Choosing to make the antagonist blind was a result of deliberately taking abilities away from him; Álvarez explained, 

Álvarez has called the movie an "exercise in reversal" noting that the film deliberately subverts tropes such as the fact that the house in question is  a "nice house on a scary street" as opposed to the opposite, or that the movie is a home invasion story told from the point of view of the invaders.

Casting
On May 1, 2015, Daniel Zovatto joined the cast. On May 22, 2015, Dylan Minnette was cast in the film, and on June 18, 2015, Jane Levy and Stephen Lang joined the cast.

Filming
Principal photography began on June 29, 2015. Though the film is set in Detroit, it was primarily shot in Hungary; only a few views of Detroit were actually filmed there. Álvarez estimated that the film cost roughly half as much as Evil Dead, and welcomed the change, as it allowed for less studio interference.  Filming wrapped in August 2015.

Release 
The film premiered at South by Southwest on March 12, 2016, and was theatrically released on August 26, 2016, by Screen Gems.

Reception

Critical response
On review aggregation website Rotten Tomatoes the film has an approval rating of 88% based on 241 reviews, with an average rating of 7.30/10. The site's critical consensus reads, "Don't Breathe smartly twists its sturdy premise to offer a satisfyingly tense, chilling addition to the home invasion genre that's all the more effective for its simplicity." Metacritic, which assigns a rating to reviews, gives the film a score of 71 out of 100, based on 39 critics, indicating "generally favorable reviews". Audiences polled by CinemaScore gave the film an average grade of "B+" on an A+ to F scale.

Dennis Harvey of Variety called Don't Breathe "a muscular exercise in brutal, relentless peril that should please genre fans." Jim Vejvoda of IGN awarded 8.8/10 and wrote, "Director Fede Álvarez delivers a lean, very mean thrill ride with Don't Breathe, tapping into several primal human fears and further establishing himself as one of the genre filmmakers to keep an eye on in the years ahead." Peter Travers of Rolling Stone gave the film 3 out of 4 stars, writing: "This is some weird, twisted shit. Don't groan when I say Don't Breathe is a home-invasion thriller. Director Fede Álvarez is as good as it gets when it comes to playing with things that go bump in the night." Kyle Smith of the New York Post also gave the film 3 out of 4 stars, saying, "Apart from its thin characters and occasional trite moments, as well as a silly attempt to set up a sequel, Don't Breathe is just about perfect."

Amy Nicholson of MTV wrote in a positive review, "Álvarez knows the size of his ambitions. He's written one great ghoul, surrounded him with targets, and simply let him let rip." The Verge called it "an impressive script-flip from the 1967 classic Wait Until Dark". Álvarez says he wrote the script before watching Wait Until Dark. Jim Hemphill of Filmmaker Magazine called it "the best American horror film in twenty years."

Box office 
Don't Breathe grossed $89.2 million in North America and $67.9 million in other territories for a worldwide total of $157.1 million, against a production budget of $9.9 million. Due to its low production budget, the film became a sleeper hit and was considered a large financial success, with a net profit of $59.1 million, when factoring together all expenses and revenues. For Sony Pictures, it became their second late-summer surprise hit of 2016, following Sausage Party.

Don't Breathe was released in the United States and Canada on August 26, 2016, and was originally projected to gross $11–14 million from 3,051 theaters in its opening weekend, with some estimates going as high as $20 million, and many publications noting it could be the first film to dethrone Suicide Squad from the top of the box office. It made $1.9 million from Thursday night preview screenings, at 2,500 theaters, and $10 million on its opening day. It fell just 1.5% on Saturday, earning $9.8 million, which is uncommon as R-rated horror films tend to do well on their first day and drop sharply in revenue from their second day onward. Compared to other 2016 horror films, Lights Out had a drop of 22%, while The Conjuring 2 fell by 15%. In total, it grossed $26.4 million in its opening weekend, far above initial projections by 120% and easily displacing Suicide Squad to take the top spot at the box office. It was the biggest original horror debut of the year (besting 10 Cloverfield Lane), the biggest Screen Gems August opening ever (beating Takers) and the biggest debut for an R-rated original horror film since The Conjuring in 2013. Following its first-place finish, the film continued to dominate the box office for the second weekend, earning $15.8 million and an estimated $19.7 million for the four day Labor Day holiday, one of the best numbers ever for the long holiday weekend. As a result, it became only the second horror film to top the weekend box office two weekends in a row since 2014. The second weekend drop was only -40%, a remarkable feat considering the fact that horror films typically tumble at least 60% or more in their second weekend. The gradual drop was due to the holiday. It took only 11 days to surpass Álvarez's previous film, the Evil Dead reboot.

Although the film fell to third place in its third weekend as a result of being overtaken by Sully and When the Bough Breaks, it continued to witness strong holds by falling 49% after adding another 333 theaters.

Outside North America, the film's biggest debuts were in the United Kingdom ($1.3 million), Germany ($1.3 million), Brazil ($1.2 million) Mexico ($1.2 million) and Australia ($1 million). It scored the third biggest opening of the year for a Hollywood film in Korea with $4.5 million. It's on pace to become the highest-grossing horror film in Uruguay.

Accolades

Sequel 

In November 2016, writer and director Fede Álvarez announced that a sequel was in the works. Producer Sam Raimi commented on the sequel and was quoted saying, "It's only the greatest idea for a sequel I've ever heard. I'm not kidding." In November 2018, Álvarez announced the script for the sequel was completed.

In January 2020, the title was announced as Don't Breathe 2. The film was to begin principal photography in the April 2020, with a script co-written by Rodo Sayagues and Álvarez, but was delayed due to the COVID-19 pandemic. Eventually, Sayagues served as director, while the latter served as a producer. On October 8, 2020, Lang revealed filming had completed. The film was released on August 13, 2021.

See also 
 List of films featuring home invasions

References

External links 
 
 
 
 
 

2016 films
2016 crime thriller films
2016 horror thriller films
American crime thriller films
American horror thriller films
Crime horror films
Films about blind people
Films about kidnapping
Films about dysfunctional families
Films about rape
Films directed by Fede Álvarez
Films produced by Fede Álvarez
Films produced by Rodo Sayagues
Films produced by Sam Raimi
Films scored by Roque Baños
Films set in Detroit
Films shot in Detroit
Films shot in Hungary
Films with screenplays by Fede Álvarez
Films with screenplays by Rodo Sayagues
Ghost House Pictures films
Home invasions in film
Screen Gems films
Stage 6 Films films
2010s English-language films
2010s American films
Films set in basement